John C. "Skee" Levi (June 14, 1898 – January 22, 1946) was an Arapaho Indian athlete, playing college football for the Haskell Indians. Allegedly Jim Thorpe called him the greatest athlete he'd ever seen. He then coached at his alma mater.

Levi died on January 22, 1946, at Denver General Hospital in Denver, Colorado, after he was fatally stabbed by Fannie Stabler. In May 1946, Stabler was convicted of voluntary manslaughter.

References

1898 births
1946 deaths
American football fullbacks
Haskell Indian Nations Fighting Indians football coaches
Haskell Indian Nations Fighting Indians football players
Phillips Haymakers football players
All-American college football players
People from Caddo County, Oklahoma
Male murder victims
People murdered in Colorado